Future (stylized on digital releases in all caps) is the fifth studio album by American rapper Future. It was released on February 17, 2017, by A1 Recordings, Freebandz and Epic Records. The album features production by Metro Boomin, Zaytoven, DJ Khaled, The Beat Bully, Southside, alongside production from other members of 808 Mafia such as DY, Fuse, Tarentino and Tre Pounds. The album was supported by three singles: "Draco", "Mask Off" and "Extra Luv".

Background
The eponymously titled album was announced through social media on February 14, 2017. Future then followed up by posting on social media moments after.

Singles
"Draco" was released as the first single from the album on February 21, 2017. The song debuted and peaked at number 46 on the Billboard Hot 100.

"Mask Off" was released as the second single on April 18, 2017. The song peaked at number five on the Billboard Hot 100.

"Extra Luv" was released as the third single on June 30, 2017 after being included as a streaming bonus track on the deluxe edition of the album. The single features a guest appearance from rapper YG.

The song "Used to This" featuring Drake, which was previously released as a single on November 4, 2016, was also included on the deluxe edition.

Critical reception

Future received positive reviews from critics. At Metacritic, which assigns a normalized rating out of 100 to reviews from mainstream publications, the album received an average score of 67, based on 15 reviews. Riley Wallace of Exclaim! wrote, "With exciting production that features his usual cast of ATL tastemakers who are (in some cases) paired with surprising co-producers like Jake One and !llmind, Future has crafted an opus full of bangers. So, while he doesn't break much new creative ground, there's a lot to love about Future." Jordan Sargent of Spin dubbed it "a clear return to form". Colin Groundwater for Pretty Much Amazing stated that "Future is too persistent. In striving for consistency, he sacrifices discretion and intention. One wishes he would take a break—God knows he's earned it. Some time might allow for a stronger sense of intention."

Writing for The Observer, Alex Macpherson concluded, "...[and] as a body of work, this album is neither an elevation over nor an advancement of his stream of recent material. At this point, merely shoring up his personal brand with scattered highlights means that Future is stuck in a holding pattern." Chase McMullen, an author for The 405, said, "In a genre that's hard on longevity, and an era with an even shorter attention span, Future has refused to lose, time and again. He certainly doesn't end here. Yet, after a year of baited breathing, we seem to have arrived at an in-between. There's still plenty of fun to be had in the waiting room, but let's hope he has more in store for the next appointment." Sheldon Pearce of Pitchfork, noted the album for being "...an ambitious Future exhibition" with "a pretty interesting array of textures, sonically."

Commercial performance
Future debuted at number one on the Billboard 200 with 140,000 album-equivalent units, of which 60,000 were pure album sales. It became Future's fourth number-one album following DS2, What a Time to Be Alive with Drake, and Evol. As of September 27, 2017, the album has moved 902,000 album-equivalent units. On July 14, 2017, the album was certified Platinum by the Recording Industry Association of America (RIAA) for combined sales album-equivalent units of over a million units in the United States.

Track listing

Notes
  signifies a co-producer
  signifies an additional producer

Sample credits
 "Mask Off" contains samples of the song "Prison Song" by Tommy Butler.
 "Might As Well" contains sampled elements of the song "Owl", written by Edwin Butler, William Butler, Régine Chassagne, Jeremy Gara, Tim Kingsbury, Richard Parry and Owen Pallett, and performed by Arcade Fire.

Personnel
Credits adapted from The Fader and Tidal.

Technical

 Joshua Sellers – recording 
 Noah Shebib – recording 
 Noel Cadastre – recording 
 Eric Manco – mixing , recording 
 DJ Esco – mixing 
 Seth Firkins – mixing , recording 
 Jaycen Joshua – mixing 
 Mike Symphony – mixing assistance 
 Phillip "Big Dockz" Cromwell – mixing assistance 
 David Nakaji – mixing assistance 
 Ivan Jimenez – mixing assistance 
 Glenn Schick – mastering

Charts

Weekly charts

Year-end charts

Decade-end charts

Certifications

Release history

References

2017 albums
Future (rapper) albums
Albums produced by Zaytoven
Albums produced by Southside (record producer)
Albums produced by Metro Boomin
Albums produced by DJ Khaled
Albums produced by Jake One
Albums produced by Detail (record producer)